Laperousea is a genus of South Pacific dwarf spiders that was first described by R. de Dalmas in 1917.  it contains only two species, both found in Australia and New Zealand: L. blattifera and L. quindecimpunctata.

See also
 List of Linyphiidae species (I–P)

References

Araneomorphae genera
Linyphiidae
Spiders of Australia
Spiders of New Zealand